Muriel Wood is a Canadian artist.

Biography 

After graduating from the Canterbury College of Art, she began illustrating children's books. She taught illustration at the Ontario College of Art for ten years. Among the books she has illustrated are The Olden Days Coat by Margaret Laurence, Anne of Green Gables by L.M. Montgomery, Old Bird by Irene Morck, Lizzie's Storm by Sally Fitz-Gibbon, Scared Sarah by Mary Alice Downie, and Aram's Choice and Call Me Aram by Marsha Forchuk Skrypuch. Her illustrations have also appeared on Canadian postage stamps. She lives with her husband, illustrator, graphic artist and designer David Chestnutt, in Toronto, Ontario.

References

Canadian children's book illustrators
Living people
Year of birth missing (living people)
Alumni of the University for the Creative Arts
OCAD University alumni
Artists from Toronto